Tewkesbury is a medieval market town and civil parish in the north of Gloucestershire, England. The town has significant history in the Wars of the Roses and grew since the building of Tewkesbury Abbey. It stands at the confluence of the River Severn and the River Avon, and thus became an important trading point, which continued as railways and later M5 and M50 motorway connections were established.
The town gives its name to the Borough of Tewkesbury, due to the earlier governance by the Abbey, yet the town is the second largest settlement in the Borough. The town lies on border with Worcestershire, identified largely by the Carrant Brook (a tributary of the River Avon).

The name Tewkesbury is thought to come from Theoc, the name of a Saxon who founded a hermitage there in the 7th century, and in the Old English language was called . An erroneous derivation from Theotokos (the Greek title of Mary, mother of God) enjoyed currency in the monastic period of the town's history.

The Battle of Tewkesbury, which took place on 4 May 1471, was one of the decisive battles of the Wars of the Roses and is marked annually by a medieval festival throughout the town, including display of historically accurate banners and reenactment.

Geography

Geographic position
The town grew due to trading at the confluence of River Severn and Avon, and meeting point of main roads between Gloucester and Worcester. The town is approximately halfway between these adjacent cities, positioned where natural rises in the land allowed early settlers in the town to avoid flooding, yet to take advantage of the fertile soils and transport connections. The layout of the town centre and radiating trunk roads remain much unchanged since mediaeval settlement.

Expansion
In 1965, Tewkesbury borough, Gloucestershire, was enlarged by incorporating the then-new Mitton housing estate, on land previously in Bredon parish, Worcestershire, as part of the West Midland Counties Order. The estate now forms part of the "Tewkesbury Town with Mitton" borough council ward, which also covers Tewkesbury town centre. A further housing project in Mitton was completed in the first decade of 2000. Mitton is now a contiguous low-density rural suburb connected to Tewkesbury.

Nearby places

 Bredon
 Bishop's Cleeve
 Cheltenham
 Evesham
 Gloucester
 Pershore
 Malvern (Great Malvern)
 Upton upon Severn
 Cotswolds
 Forest of Dean
 Malvern Hills
 Winchcombe
 Gretton

Demography
At the 2021 UK census the Tewkesbury parish had a population of 10,663. If the neighbouring parishes of Wheatpieces (3,582), Northway (4,859) and Ashchurch Rural (1,814) are added, the figure rises to 20,918. The Tewkesbury urban area is divided in two by the north–south running M5 motorway, opened in February 1971. However, the town is generally considered as the built-up area to the immediate east and west of the M5 at junction 9, with the town centre, abbey and old town situated to the west. The close proximity of large areas of land that are prone to flooding, as evidenced by the severe floods that struck the region in July 2007, would make further expansion difficult. However, the present Borough of Tewkesbury, created on 1 April 1974, also contains a large portion of rural north Gloucestershire, extending as far as the edges of Gloucester itself and also Cheltenham, and has a present population of 94,884.

Historical landmarks

The town features many Medieval and Tudor buildings, but is most famous for Tewkesbury Abbey, a Norman abbey church.

The Abbey
The Abbey was built by the Normans and consecrated in the year 1121.
Originally the Abbey formed part of a Benedictine monastery and was saved from the Dissolution of the Monasteries by King Henry VIII after being bought by the townspeople for the price of the lead on the roof to use as their parish church. 
Most of the monastery buildings, as well as the vineyards, were destroyed during this time. The Abbey Mill however still remains, resting upon the Mill Avon, a channel allegedly built by the monks. This channel represents one of the biggest projects in Tewkesbury's history, though the present weir dates only from the 1990s, replacing two sluice gates installed in the 1930s. The Abbey Mill is also sometimes known as "Abel Fletcher's Mill", but this is simply the name given to it in Dinah Craik's novel John Halifax, Gentleman, whose setting Norton Bury is based on Tewkesbury.

The abbey is thought to be the site of the place where the hermit Theoc once lived. The Romanesque arch and stained glass window has been restored. The monastery was founded by the Despensers as a family mausoleum, and the Despenser and Neville tombs are fine examples of small-scale late medieval stonework.

The tower is believed to be the largest Norman tower still in existence (though that at Norwich Cathedral is another strong contender). The tower once had a wooden spire which may have taken the total height of the building to as much as 260 feet, but this was blown off in a heavy storm on Easter Monday 1559; the present pinnacles and battlements were added in 1600 to give the tower a more "finished" look. The abbey is thought to be the third largest church in Britain that is not a cathedral (after Westminster Abbey and Beverley Minster). The abbey is a parish church, still used for daily services, and is believed to be the second-largest parish church in England, again, after Beverley Minster.

Pubs, inns and taverns
Tewkesbury claims Gloucestershire's oldest public house, the Black Bear, dating from 1308. The pub closed in 2017 and has undergoing extensive, thorough renovation 2019–2022. Other notable large hostelries are the Royal Hop Pole Hotel in Church Street (which has recently been converted into a part of the Wetherspoons pub chain with the discovery of a former medieval banqueting hall in the structure), mentioned in Charles Dickens' The Pickwick Papers, the Bell Hotel, a large half-timbered structure opposite the Abbey gateway, and the House of the Nodding Gables in the High Street.

Around the Abbey
The Abbey Cottages, adjacent to Tewkesbury Abbey, were built between 1410 and 1412. They were restored 1967 to 1972 by the Abbey Lawn Trust, a building preservation charity. They house the John Moore Museum, residential homes and commercial offices. The John Moore Museum was established in 1980 in memory of the writer and naturalist, John Moore. The museum consists of three buildings: the main John Moore Museum, home to an extensive Natural History collection; the Merchant's House, restored to its Tudor appearance; and the Old Baptist Chapel. The Old Baptist Chapel, located off Church Street, is a timber-framed building, formally a medieval hall house dating to the 1480s. Sometime in the 17th century, it was converted for use as a Nonconformist meeting house. Including the original baptistery and pastor's room, the building is of significant historic interest. The building was restored to its 1720 appearance in the 1970s by Tewkesbury Borough Council. It was further renovated and interpreted in 2015 by the Abbey Lawn Trust and is used as a venue for a variety of cultural events. Behind the chapel is a small cemetery for those who were members of the congregation. This includes the grave of William Shakespeare-Hart, fifth great-grandnephew of William Shakespeare. The cemetery is managed by Tewkesbury Borough Council.

Along the river
Just to the west of the town is Thomas Telford's Mythe Bridge over the River Severn, a cast-iron structure with a  span, opened in 1826. Tewkesbury's other notable bridge is the stone-built King John's Bridge over the Avon, commissioned by King John in the late 12th century as part of improvements to the main road from Gloucester to Worcester. Original stonework can still be seen on its north side; the bridge was widened in the 1950s to meet traffic requirements at the time.

The river was significant in the commercial development of the town.
The large industrial flour mill site, built in 1865 stands near the confluence of the Avon and Severn rivers, where barges were used to transport goods. The mill, known as Healing's Mill (and previously owned by Allied Bakeries) closed for milling in 2006.
The mill building facing the river is now a well-known "at risk" structure, and can be seen clearly to have sunk on one end of its foundations.

The Gloucestershire Water Rescue Centre, also known as Tewkesbury fire station, is a combined project between Severn Area Rescue Association (SARA) and Gloucestershire Fire and Rescue Service (GFRS).

Mythe Chapel, which was built in 1870, was deconsecrated in 1977.

Governance

Modern governance

The Town of Tewkesbury is located within the Non-Metropolitan County of Gloucestershire and forms part of the Tewkesbury Urban Area. Civil Parishes of Tewkesbury Town, Wheatpieces and Northway form the Tewkesbury Urban Area. The Tewkesbury Town Civil Parish is the largest Parish within the Urban Area and is the location of the Deveraux Centre, Tewkesbury Community Hospital, Tewkesbury Leisure Centre, Tewkesbury Borough Council Public Services Centre and the main shopping streets.

The Town Council (not to be confused with Tewkesbury Borough, which covers a wider area than Tewkesbury Town) has 16 members from the four wards of Town with Mitton, Newtown, Priors Park, and Mythe who are elected every four years. Councillors were last elected in 2019, with all councillors sitting as independents. The Mayor of Tewkesbury Councillor Simon Raywood is the civic head of the council and chairs meetings of the full council. The council also appoints a Deputy Mayor who supports the Mayor in their duties and often succeeds to the office of Mayor in the following civic year. The council was formally established in 1974 following the dissolution of the municipal borough of Tewkesbury but continues to occupy Tewkesbury Town Hall and maintains the same civic role within the Town.

Following the 2019 local elections, the Town Council continues to be formed of 16 members representing the three wards of Tewkesbury North, Tewkesbury South and Newtown. The boundaries of these new Town Council Wards mirror the new Tewkesbury Borough Wards of Tewkesbury North with Twyning, Tewkesbury South and Tewkesbury East. The Gloucestershire County Council divisions of Tewkesbury and Tewkesbury East is unchanged by the new ward boundaries at the Town and Borough Councils.

Tewkesbury is also covered by Tewkesbury Borough Council (district level) and Gloucestershire County Council. Tewkesbury is part of the wider Tewkesbury constituency for elections to the House of Commons. Prior to Brexit in 2020, it was represented in the European Parliament as part of the South West England constituency in the European Parliament.

Through the provisions of the Local Government Act 1972, a new District Council was created comprising the pre-1974 Tewkesbury Borough, Cheltenham Rural District and parts of Gloucester Rural District. In May 1973 a joint committee of the predecessor Councils recommended that a new Royal Charter be applied for. This Royal Charter conferring Borough Status was granted on 27 February 1973 and took effect on 1 April 1974. By virtue of this Charter the Borough appoint a Mayor and Deputy Mayor which results in there being two Mayors covering Tewkesbury at different level of government. The Borough Mayor being the first citizen of Tewkesbury Borough and the Town Mayor being the first citizen of the Town itself.

Historical governance and town mayoralty

The following table lists the Mayors of Tewkesbury between 1836 and 1973. After 1973 both Tewkesbury Borough and Tewkesbury Town Council have appointed the Borough Mayor and Town Mayor respectively. The date of the Mayors Election changed from November to May in 1947/48 during the term of office of J.O. Martin JP.

Railways

Tewkesbury is served by Ashchurch for Tewkesbury railway station. It was the last mainline station in Gloucestershire to be reopened after British Rail was fragmented into Railtrack.

The first station was opened by the Birmingham and Gloucester Railway in 1840 and was sited in the High Street. It was replaced in 1864 by a new station built for the Tewkesbury and Malvern Railway.  This closed on 14 August 1961, when the Ashchurch to Upton-on-Severn passenger service was withdrawn by British Railways (through trains to  had previously ceased in December 1952).  Freight traffic continued until final closure in December 1964. Removal of the railway embankment between Ashchurch and Tewkesbury began in 2013 to aid flood prevention in Tewkesbury.

Road transport
Tewkesbury is served by the M5 and M50 motorways and the A38 and A46 trunk roads. There are regular direct buses to Cheltenham, Gloucester and Evesham. Congestion on the A46 around Ashchurch and junction 9 of the M5 is being addressed through a series of road works starting in 2014.

A network of bus services serve the town and surrounding district including services to Gloucester and Evesham. Buses run hourly daily from outside Ashchurch railway station to Tewkesbury town centre but only a limited number of journeys operate in the opposite direction.

In Newtown, Tewkesbury 10 per cent of all work trips are made by bicycle.
There are some bicycle paths in the built up area of Tewkesbury.

Culture
Roses Theatre combines an arthouse cinema and a live performance venue. The Roses Theatre is where comedian Eric Morecambe collapsed after a charity performance in May 1984. He died hours later in Cheltenham General Hospital. A conference/changing room was later named after him.
Battle of Tewkesbury, mentioned in Shakespeare's play Richard III.
Raymond Priestley, geologist on Robert Falcon Scott's expedition to the South Pole, left one of the sleds, used on that expedition, to the former Tewkesbury Grammar School (c. 1576 – 1972). It is now kept in the Tewkesbury School's Humanities building.
Tewkesbury mustard, a blend of mustard and horseradish, made the town famous in the 17th century and is again being manufactured. The mustard was mentioned in some of Shakespeare's works.
Ska punk band Spunge are from Tewkesbury.
On Wednesdays and Saturdays, one of the town centre car parks is the location of Tewkesbury Market. A farmers' market is also held every month close by Tewkesbury Abbey.

Festivals and fairs
In February Tewkesbury holds a Winter Beer Festival, organised by the Tewkesbury branch of CAMRA.
Since 2005, an annual Food and Drink Festival has been held, in or near the Abbey grounds.
On the second full weekend of July the town hosts Tewkesbury Medieval Festival, Europe's largest battle re-enactment and fair. Thousands of re-enactors travel to the town from around the world to re-enact the Battle of Tewkesbury near to the original battle site. The festival includes a "living history" recreation of a medieval encampment, games, food and a large fair where re-enactment clothing, furniture and weaponry can be purchased. In 2008 the festival celebrated its 25th anniversary. It has been described by Footprint Travel Guides as one of the "ten most bizarre festivals" in the country.
In July the Water Festival takes place with events on the river and the banks including an evening procession of lit boats ending with a firework display. The festival started in 1996 but its future is now in question due to funding issues and the 2006 event was much reduced in scale. The event was cancelled in 2007 as it coincided with the Summer 2007 Flood (it went ahead later in the year). The event was scheduled for 2008 on Saturday, 20 September, but was again cancelled due to flooding in the weeks prior to the event.
On 9 and 10 October, the town holds the annual mop fair. Originally a hiring fair where people came to seek employment, the event is now a large travelling funfair taking over much of the centre of town. The fair itself is also an underlining point of Tewkesbury's industrial past, as Walker Gallopers were produced in the area by Walkers in the early 20th century. The fair is organised by The Showmen's Guild of Great Britain (Western Section). The fair is never held on a Sunday.
Every year at the end of July and into August the Abbey hosts a festival of liturgical music entitled Musica Deo Sacra (Music Sacred to God).

Cultural references
Victorian author Dinah Craik (1826–1887) visited Tewkesbury in 1852, and later set her most famous work John Halifax, Gentleman (pub. 1857) in the town, calling it "Norton Bury". There is a Craik House on Church Street, but Craik never lived there and has no other connection with Tewkesbury. Despite this, there is a memorial to her in the Abbey's south transept.
Author John Moore (1907–1967) was born and lived in Tewkesbury. He set his novel Portrait of Elmbury (pub. 1945) as a "fictionalised biography" of Tewkesbury, the town being the "Elmbury" of the book. Another of his books, Brensham Village (published in 1946) used nearby Bredon as its basis. A local museum has been named after him.
A.E. Housman's A Shropshire Lad also mentions Tewkesbury, as well as nearby Bredon Hill, even though neither place is in Shropshire.
Two episodes of the children's TV programme Rosie and Jim are set in the town and feature the Abbey prominently in one of the episodes.
The opening scene of the 1995 film version of Richard III takes place at the field headquarters of King Henry's army at Tewkesbury.
Two episodes of the BBC show Antiques Roadshow series 39 are set on the Abbey grounds. One episode features a rare 18th-century dress which was valued at £40,000.
The 2020 film Enola Holmes features the disappearance of the fictional Viscount of Tewkesbury, Marquess of Basilwether, played by actor Louis Partridge.

Notable people
 John Barston – English writer and law civic figure – born Tewkesbury c. 1545
 Robert Harold Compton – South African botanist – born Tewkesbury 1886.
 Henry Disston – American industrialist – born Tewkesbury 1819.
 Anna Ford – newsreader and TV presenter – born Tewkesbury 1943.
 Henry Green – author – born Tewkesbury 1905.
 Kathleen Hawkins - New Zealand poet – born Tewkesbury 1883.
 Alfred Jones – cricketer – born Tewkesbury 1900.
 John Moore – writer – born Tewkesbury 1907.
 Eric Morecambe –  comedian – collapsed at the Roses Theatre 1984 and died a day later.
 Mel Nicholls – Paralympic wheelchair racer.
 Raymond Priestley – Antarctic explorer – born Tewkesbury 1886.
 Eunice Spry – foster mother convicted of child abuse in 2007 – lived in Tewkesbury.
 Oswald Wardell-Yerburgh – vicar – 1899 to 1913.
 Terry Pendry - the late Queen’s head groom for 28 years now installed as a ‘military knight’ at Windsor

Sports and recreation
Tewkesbury has one of the 471 King George's Fields as its recreation ground.
The football club, Tewkesbury Town FC have three men's teams in the Saturday Cheltenham Leagues, two teams in the Evesham Birdseye Sunday Leagues, a Veterans team for ages 35+ in the Gloucestershire North County League and hold weekly training sessions for Ladies in preparation for starting a team in the 2014/15 season. They are holders of the Gloucestershire County Cup as well as the Evesham Bluck cup, Pershore Hospital cup, are Evesham League Division 3 Champions and are the Evesham Leagues Team of the Year 2012/13.
The cricket team, Tewkesbury Cricket Club 1st XI play in the Glos/wilts Division of the West of England Premier League.
The rugby team, Tewkesbury RFC, plays Rugby Union in Gloucestershire Division One and has gained promotion to Gloucester Division Premiership
The running club, Tewkesbury AC compete in local, national and international running events.
Cheltenham College Boathouse is situated at Lower Lode
Facilities at Tewkesbury School are used as a public sports centre for swimming, gym, squash and other sports.
The Tewkesbury lawn green Bowling Club plays in the Gloucestershire men's and ladies leagues.
The Tewkesbury swimming club is in Tewkesbury and trains at the Leisure Centre near the Tewkesbury Abbey, and at the Tewkesbury School swimming pool.

Twin town
Tewkesbury Borough is twinned with Miesbach in Bavaria, Germany.
Tewkesbury Town has had a sister city relationship twinned with Tewksbury Township, New Jersey, United States of America since 2003 and also has ties with Stoneham-et-Tewkesbury, Quebec, Canada. During the 1990s the relationship between the town of Tewkesbury, Gloucestershire and Tewksbury, Massachusetts was strengthened and the possibility of a formal twinning was investigated. A formal twinning arrangement between the two towns was not progressed during the 1990s although a link was maintained during this time. The relationship between these two towns resulted in the placing of the Miko Kaufman sculpture called Touching Souls at Tewkesbury Abbey.

See also
Murder of Marie Wilks

References

External links

Tewkesbury Borough Council
BBC archive film of Tewkesbury from 1984
Tewkesbury Town Showcase and Events 
Tewkesbury's Medieval Festival annual event – United Kingdom
Tewkesbury's annual Medieval Life from the court to the kitchens event – United Kingdom

 
Populated places on the River Severn
Towns in Gloucestershire